Thorwald Nicolaus Tideman (not ; born August 11, 1943 in Chicago, Illinois) is a Georgist economist and professor at Virginia Tech. He received his Bachelor of Arts in economics and mathematics from Reed College in 1965 and his PhD in economics from the University of Chicago in 1969. Tideman was an Assistant Professor of Economics at Harvard University from 1969-1973, during which time from 1970-1971 he was a Senior Staff Economist for the President's Council of Economic Advisors. Since 1973, he has been at Virginia Tech, with various visiting positions at Harvard Kennedy School (1979-1980), University of Buckingham (1985-1986), and the American Institute for Economic Research (1999-2000).

Research 
Tideman's academic interests include taxation of land, voting theory, and political philosophy.

Ranked Pairs 

In 1987, he devised the voting system called "ranked pairs" (or the "Tideman method" or simply "RP"), which is a type of Condorcet method. It selects a single winner using votes that express a preference ranking. Ranked pairs can also be used to create a sorted list of winners.

Other research 

In 2000, Tideman developed the CPO-STV proportional voting method. Tideman also devised the independence of clones criterion which both of his methods satisfy. He is an associate of the Earth Rights Institute.  His book Collective Decisions and Voting: The Potential for Public Choice was published by Ashgate Publishing in November 2006.

References

External links 
Nicolaus Tideman's website
 

1943 births
Living people
People from Chicago
Reed College alumni
Economists from Illinois
Virginia Tech faculty
Harvard Kennedy School staff
Academics of the University of Buckingham
Voting theorists
Georgist economists
21st-century American economists